Gottlieb Jakob Kuhn (16 October 1775 – 23 July 1849) was a Bernese pastor, folklorist and poet, known for his dialectal songs. He edited the Bernese Hinkender Bote almanac from 1804 to 1810. In 1811, he co-founded the folkloristic periodical Alpenrosen.

References

External links
 Lieder von Gottlieb Jakob Kuhn

Swiss male poets
1775 births
1849 deaths
People from the canton of Bern
19th-century Swiss poets
19th-century male writers